Ath/Isières Airfield  is a private ultralight aviation field, located near the Walloon city of Ath, Hainaut, Belgium. Like most small aerodromes in Belgium it welcomes visitors, but prior permission is legally required.

See also
List of airports in Belgium

References

External links 
 Airport record for Ath/Isieres Airport at Landings.com

Airports in Hainaut (province)
Ath